Ringiculoides kurilensis is a species of small sea snail, a marine gastropod mollusk in the family Ringiculidae.

Distribution
This species occurs in the western North Pacific.

References

External links

Ringiculidae
Gastropods described in 1966